was a Japanese actor. He appeared in more than 50 films and television shows between 1974 and 2010. He starred in the 1982 film Farewell to the Land, which was entered into the 32nd Berlin International Film Festival.

Partial filmography

Film

 Nureta sai no me (1974)
 Genkai-nada (1976) - Yakuzu
 Sono go no jingi naki tatakai (1979) - Toshio Aiba
 Kagemusha (1980) - Sohachiro Tsuchiya
 Station (1981) - Goro Yoshimatsu
 Farewell to the Land (1982) - Yukio Yamazawa
 Kono ko no nanatsu no oiwai ni (1982) - Sudo
 Kidonappu burûsu (1982) - Drunk
 Daijôbu, mai furendo (1983) - Doctor
 Ran (1985) - Jiro
 Angel's Egg (1985) - Boy (voice)
 Yoshiwara enjô (1987) - Shinsuke Furushima
 Kono aino monogatari (1987) - Murasame
 The Man Who Assassinated Ryoma (1987) - Sakamoto Ryōma
 Nikutai no mon (1988)
 226 (1989) - Tsukasa Kono
 Raffles Hotel (1989) - Toshimichi Kariya
 Tasmania Story (1990) - Haruo Tozuki
 Patlabor 2: The Movie (1993) - Yukihito Tsuge (voice)
 Nûdo no yoru (1993) - Kozo Yukikata
 Tenshi no harawata: Akai senkô (1994) - Muraki
 Yoru ga mata kuru (1994) - Namekata Kozo
 Gonin (1995) - Kaname Hizu
 Ruby Fruit (1995) - Hisao Kagami
 Sayonara Nippon! (1995)
 Gennsou Andalusia (1996)
 Natsu jikan no otonatachi (1996) - Man in TV Drama
 Fukigen na kajitsu (1977) - Osamu Nomura
 Rabu retâ (1998) - Satake
 Kuro no tenshi Vol. 1 (1998) - Goro Nogi
 Tadon to chikuwa (1998) - Anzai
 Nobody (1999)
 Saraba gokudo dead beat (1999)
 Jubaku: Spellbound (1999) - Kohei Nakayama
 Owls' Castle (1999) - Hattori Hanzo
 Shisha no gakuensai (2000) - Shozo Yuki
 Senrigan (2000)
 Red Shadow (2001) - Gensai
 Kikuchi-jô monogatari - sakimori-tachi no uta (2001) - Frontier guard
 The Man In White (2003)
 Doragon heddo (2003) - Matsuo
 The Man in White Part 2: Requiem for the Lion (2003)
 Runin: Banished (2004) - Inaba
 Gonin Saga (2015) - Kaname Hizu

Television
 Zatōichi: The Palanquin Wars Of Tempo Period (1978–1979)
 Ōgon no Hibi (1978) - Ishikawa Goemon
 Shishi no Jidai (1980) - Itō Hirobumi
 Taiheiki (1991) - Nitta Yoshisada
 Honmamon (2001–2002) - Ichiro Yamanaka

References

External links

1947 births
2016 deaths
Japanese male film actors
Actors from Yamanashi Prefecture